Mo Guanfu ( or; Vietnamese: Mạc Quan Phù, ?–1801) was a powerful Chinese pirate throughout the South China Sea in the late 1700s.

Mo was born to a woodsman's family in Suixi County, Guangdong. He was kidnapped by the pirates in 1787. His family was too poor to pay ransom, so he had to join in the pirate group.

He was recruited by Tay Son dynasty in 1788, and later became one of the most important subordinates under Chen Tien-pao, and was granted the title Đông Hải Vương (Han tu: 東海王, prince of East Sea) by Nguyễn Huệ. From 1788 to 1799, Mo frequently attacked the southern coast of Qing China together with Zheng Qi, Liang Wengeng (梁文庚) and Fan Wencai (樊文才).

Tay Son army was utterly beaten by his rival Nguyen lord in 1801 and, Mo was captured by Nguyen lord together with Liang Wen-keng and Fan Wen-tsai. They were extradited to China and later Lingchi in Guangzhou.

See also
Pirates of the South China Coast

References

Chinese pirates
Tây Sơn dynasty generals
Executed Qing dynasty people
1801 deaths
18th-century pirates